The Jewish Museum of Rhodes is a museum located in the Old Town of the island of Rhodes, eastern Greece. It was established by Aron Hasson of the Rhodes Jewish Historical Foundation in 1997 to preserve the Jewish history and culture of Rhodes. It is adjacent to the Kahal Shalom Synagogue, which is the oldest synagogue in Greece and is located in six rooms formerly used as the women’s prayer rooms.

See also
 History of the Jews in Greece
 Jewish Museum of Greece
 Jewish Museum of Thessaloniki
 History of the Jews of Thessaloniki

References

 Porat-Noy, Zvi, Chief Editor.  "The Jewish World, Yearbook for Jewish Communities and Organizations". Ramat-Gan, Israel.  1999 edition, page 11.
 "Erensia Sefardi"; Dr. Albert de Vidas, Editor. Fairfield, Connecticut; Vol. 6, No. 1, Winter 1998 edition, page 7.
 "Ke Haber?" Newsletter; The Rhodes Jewish Historical Foundation.  Los Angeles, California.  Winter 1998/1999 issue.

External links 

 
 The Virtual Jewish History Tour: Greece

Jewish Greek history
Buildings and structures in Rhodes (city)
Museums in Rhodes
Jewish museums in Greece
Jewish Rhodian history